Images – The Best of Jean-Michel Jarre is a compilation album by Jean-Michel Jarre originally released in 1991.

Unlike previous Jean-Michel Jarre compilation albums, Images is not just a collection of separate tracks. Instead, most of the tracks appear in edited form and segued together.

Apart from Jarre's best-known tracks, the album also contains two previously unreleased tracks composed for the canceled Teotihuacan solar eclipse concert scheduled for 11 July 1991, three new versions of older work, and one rare track "Moon Machine", which had previously appeared on a flexi disc of March 1986 issue of Keyboard and on a 12" single of "Rendez-Vous IV (Special Remix)" from that same year.

At the time of release two versions were issued with different track listings. In 1997 a new version was released with both track listings combined and a few extra tracks added. The compilation was also released in VHS format in 1991. The VHS contains all Jarre's videos from 1976 to 1991, except "Equinoxe 5".

Track listing

1991 international release

1991 French release

1997 international remastered release

VHS release

Charts

Certifications and sales

References

1991 greatest hits albums
Jean-Michel Jarre albums